Samurai is a Japanese superhero in the Super Friends animated television series. His real name is Toshio Eto. He was one of the later additions to the team along with other ethnically diverse heroes in an effort for the show to promote cultural diversity. The visual design of the character was created by cartoonist Alex Toth. His voice actor is Jack Angel. In addition to being a prominent figure in several other animated shows, Angel also did the voice for The Flash and Hawkman.

Samurai appears in The All-New Super Friends Hour, Challenge of the Super Friends, Super Friends (1980), Super Friends: The Legendary Super Powers Show, and The Super Powers Team: Galactic Guardians. Besides being inserted to create diversity, Samurai, in a sense, took the place of Red Tornado with whom he shares similar wind-based abilities. After sporadic guest appearances, Samurai grew into a prominent team member in the series' later seasons.

Samurai appeared in the third volume of the DC Comics mini-series Super Powers. He also had an action figure in the Super Powers Collection line produced by Kenner. A character resembling Samurai appeared in a double page spread in the Infinite Crisis hard cover trade collection. The actual Samurai made his first appearance in the comics several years later during the Brightest Day event.

Fictional character biography
Although not outwardly resembling a traditional samurai, Samurai upholds the code of the Bushido, sometimes relating everything he or someone else does to the ancient tradition. Although he displays a good number of powers, the one he relies on most often is the ability to manipulate wind. He can fly by creating a small tornado around his lower body and can conjure powerful gusts from his hands that can knock back even large objects.

In addition to controlling wind, Samurai can also call upon other abilities he learned during his years of training in the ancient arts. He invokes them by speaking a phrase in Japanese:
 Kaze no Yō ni Hayaku (風のように早く) — The most frequently used of Samurai's powers. All of Samurai's body (except sometimes his head) becomes a powerful tornadic wind that allows him to travel at superspeed and use his winds to pick up objects or blow them around. In later episodes of the series, he would frequently appear with only his lower body transformed into a tornado. The phrase translates to "swift as the wind" and may be a reference to one line of the Fūrinkazan, the battle standard used by the Sengoku period daimyō Takeda Shingen. 
 Tōmei Ningen (透明人間) — This allows Samurai to turn invisible. The phrase translates to "transparent man/human".
 Igo Moen (囲碁もえん) — Only used once or twice throughout the series (Journey Into Blackness), Samurai engulfs himself in flames. The first half of the phrase is not proper Japanese, but the second half can be read as "great fire/flame".
 Hi ga Moe (火が燃え) - Also used only twice. This allows Samurai to cast illusions in order to fool an enemy. Both times, he created the illusion of fire to frighten his captors.

He first appeared in The All-New Super Friends Hour  and then he mostly appeared in the Challenge of the Super Friends series as a fully active member of the team. He later made sporadic appearances in the later The Super Powers Team: Galactic Guardians series.

Origin
His real name is Toshio Eto, and he was a history professor prior to becoming a superhero. One day, Eto was struck by a beam of light sent by the New Gods of New Genesis, who were trying to create more superheroes to defend the world from Darkseid. Although Eto briefly ran wild with his new powers, the New Gods explained their intent to him and he vowed to become a superhero.

Comics
Samurai made DC comics appearances during the Justice League/Justice Society of America crossover featured in the Brightest Day event. Toshio appears as one of the heroes driven insane by Alan Scott's Starheart powers, and is shown using his winds to destroy the city of Tokyo. He is defeated and knocked unconscious by Jesse Quick and Congorilla.

Prior to Samurai's appearance in Brightest Day, an alternate version of the character named Toshio was introduced into the DC Universe in the Justice League of America 80-Page Giant one-shot. This version was an actual samurai from Japan in the 13th century, who was granted mystical abilities by a sorceress. After a brief battle with the time-displaced Superman and Doctor Light, Toshio teamed up with the heroes to defeat Steppenwolf.

In the Watchmen sequel Doomsday Clock, Samurai is a member of Japan's superhero team called Big Monster Action.

In other media

Television

 A character inspired by Samurai called Wind Dragon appears in Justice League Unlimited, voiced by James Sie. He is an aerokinetic, genetically engineered superhero created by Project Cadmus to serve as the leader of their Ultimen and operate independently of the Justice League, though the former group are led to believe that they are regular metahumans. In the episode "Ultimatum", Wind Dragon and the Ultimen discover the truth behind their creation and that they are suffering from cellular breakdown. They attack their manager Maxwell Lord in an attempt to find Cadmus member Amanda Waller, only to be thwarted by the League and taken back into Cadmus' custody. In the episode "Panic in the Sky", Cadmus utilizes an army of Ultimen clones in their siege on the League's Watchtower.
 A character inspired by Samurai named Asami "Sam" Koizumi appears in Young Justice, voiced by Janice Kawaye. She is a teenage runaway who was captured and experimented on by the Reach, who activated her meta-gene and granted her the ability to focus her chi into a glowing aura that she can use to throw energy projectiles, leap at superhuman levels, and soften landings, leaving behind a trail of concentric circles whenever she does so. She was rescued by the Team and placed in S.T.A.R. Labs' custody along with Virgil Hawkins, Tye Longshadow, and Ed Dorado, but they escape and are unknowingly manipulated by Lex Luthor into helping the Light until Arsenal reveals the truth to them. After helping the Team and the Justice League thwart the Reach's invasion of Earth, she moves in with Longshadow, who she starts dating as of the third season.

Film
 Samurai makes a cameo appearance in Scooby-Doo! Mask of the Blue Falcon.
 Samurai makes a cameo appearance in The Lego Batman Movie.

Merchandise
 Samurai was released as an action figure as part of the third wave of Kenner's Super Powers Collection.
 Samurai was released in a three-pack along with Black Vulcan and Apache Chief in the Justice League Unlimited tie-in toyline.
 Samurai was released as an action figure in Wave 18 of Mattel's DC Universe Classics line.

References

Characters created by Alex Toth
Japanese-American superheroes
DC Comics superheroes
Fictional characters who can move at superhuman speeds
Television characters introduced in 1974
Japanese superheroes
Fictional characters with air or wind abilities
Fictional characters with fire or heat abilities
Fictional characters who can turn invisible
Clone characters in comics
Fictional illusionists
Fictional professors
Super Friends characters
Fictional Japanese people